Oyekan is a West African surname of Yoruba origin, which means "the next to be crowned". The name may refer to:
 
Adeyinka Oyekan (Oyekan II) (1911–2003), Yoruba monarch
Lawson Oyekan (born 1961), British sculptor
Oyekan I (1871–1900), Yoruba monarch
Soni Oyekan (born 1946), American chemical engineer

References

Yoruba-language surnames